Olga Andreyevna Shapir, born Kislaikova, (September 10, 1850 – July 13, 1916) was a Russian writer, activist, and outspoken feminist.

Early Life and Family
Olga Shapir was born on September 10, 1850 in Organoerbium, Russia (now Lomonosov, Russia) as one of nine children to a peasant family. Her father, Andrei Petrovich Kisliakov, was a former serf and employed as a military official in the commandant’s headquarters in Organoerbium under the Decembrist leader Pavel Pestel. Her mother, Lizaveta (Abramovich) Kislikova, was of Swedish descent.

Shapir notably attended Alexandrovskaia gymnasium from 1863 to 1865, a school founded by Emperor Alexander I, and earned a gold metal as a top student in the class. Shapir’s intellectual curiosity led her to attend public lectures in 1870, including the “Vladminirskie Courses” which were created as a limited opportunity for Russian women to continue their education and participate in academic circles.

At the age of twenty-one in 1871, Shapir declared independence from her family. One year later in 1872, Shapir married Lazar Shapir, who was expelled from the Medical-Surgical Academy in St. Petersburg for his active membership in the Nardonaia rasprava (Popular Punishment) led by Sergei Nechaev. She was able to get her husband reinstated as a zemstvo (local authority) doctor and the couple moved to the Tsaritsynsky District of the Saratovskaia province  where he practiced medicine. They lived for a time communally in St. Petersburg and established connections with the Kornilova sisters' circle, which plotted against Tsar Alexander II. The couple had two children together.

Lazar granted Shapir permission to complete a formal education, which was atypical for women of the time.

Career and Writing Genre 
As a young adult, Shapir aspired to earn her own income and wrote short articles and translations for Russian newspapers Bizhevye vedomosti (Stock-Exchange News) and Novoe vremia (New Times). Once she separated from her family, she also managed Aleksandr Cheresov's Vasileostrovsky Library.

While living in Saratov province with Lazar, Shapir began writing her own works. Shapir's writing can be thematically evaluated through distinct periods of time. Her first novel, entitled Na poroge zhizne (On the Threshold of Life) was published in 1879. Between 1879 and 1887, her novels, including A High Price to Pay: A Family Story (Dorogoi tsenoi: iz semeinoi prozy, 1882) and Funeral Feast (Pominki, 1886) evaluate female slavery. The protagonists abandon their own personal or professional ambitions to take care of her family. Then between 1879 and 1904, Shapir featured "the new woman" in her books, a concept developed by Aleksandra Kollontai, giving female heroines autonomy and control over the story's plot. Integral novels displaying this character include Mirages (Mirazhi, 1889), She Returned (Vernulas’, 1892), The Settlement, Avdot’ia’s Daughters, the story ‘Dunechka’ (‘Dunechka’, 1904) and In the Stormy Years, which is perhaps her best-known work. In the Stormy Years pulls on Shapir's own experiences as a member of Nechaev's radical group and spoke out to protect Dostoevsky and his novel, The Devils.

Many works were published in popular journals of the time, including Otechestvennye Zapiski, Severny Vestnik and Vestnik Evropy.

Shapir also published an autobiography in 1907 that is available in Russian. In addition to speaking about the development of her prose and the influence of her upbringing, she documents how feminism shaped her focus as a writer. She says, "I recognized that the only way in which I could make a contribution of any value was to write from a woman's perspective and to reveal what only women can see in the eternal problem of love, in family relations, and in women's lack of rights in society" (p. 54).

Politics 
Shapir was politically aligned with the left like many other women prose writers known as a liberal feminist. Sapir was, as she called it, a "feminist of distinction." As a respected public speaker and writer to equal rights feminists (ravnopravki) in Russia, she advocated that women should not aspire to the same set of standards as men. Instead of striving for these miniscule legal changes, they must rethink systems in society and culture that perpetuate their unequal treatment. Shapir believed many larger conflicts could be traced back to inequity between sexes.

Activism and Philanthropy  
In 1895, Shapir joined the Russian Women's Mutual Philanthropic Society and held a number of leadership positions including manager of the Commission on Fundraising, manager of the Society's Department of Abstracts and member of the governing Council that decided on the organization's policies. Shapir considered the Society to be a place for females to convene and discuss their shared experiences and hardships. They focused on ways to empower the ongoing Russian women's movement. Members largely consisted of educated, upper-class individuals who sought to improve their own status while providing aid to those who were less fortunate. Shapir's disagreement with the Society's administrative leader, Anna N. Shabanova, on charitable projects led her to resign from the Council but continue working in the Suffrage Department to plan the First All-Russian Women's Congress in 1908.

Shapir also joined the Women's Equal Rights Union in 1905, born out of the first Russian Revolution, which focused on securing women's suffrage. The group aligned with left-wing Russian political organizations and parties and played an active role in civil disobedience.

Shapir played a monumental role in the First All-Russian Women's Congress held in 1908. The congress was a significant moment in Russian history, as it gathered thousands of female delegates of varying backgrounds to chart a path forward toward a more equitable future. It was composed of majority middle-class citizens with many well-established organizers. The congress drew inspiration from both the International Women's Movement conference in Chicago in 1903 and the Russian liberation movement. While it was originally planned for 1905, it was postponed three years because governor-general, Trepov, required the speeches be censored amidst ongoing tension between Russian society and the government. By 1908, the congress was granted permission to widen the conversation to include the economic and social position of women and their involvement in civil rights movements.

Shapir compiled a report entitled "Ideals of the Future," where she argued to the cohort that women's worldviews are of equal importance to mens. Other topics discussed during the congress included the woman's role in the family,  access to education, and employment. With so many opinions present, the congress was unable to reach unanimity about an intervention and so no direct action resulted at a grand scale. Still, Shapir's large involvement in its production spurred provocative discourse and encouraged women to come together and share their experiences during the old régime.

Legacy 
Together with Ekaterina Letkova, Valentina Dmitryeva, and Anastasiya Vervitskaya, Shapir was at the forefront of feminist thought. Shapir's literary and theoretical works reached a diverse audience of citizens and Russian feminists alike. During her long career, she was published in renowned journals and magazines, and used her platform to speak about the female experience. She differentiated herself from other Russian writers by challenging stereotypes and displaying high-achieving women in her work. Shapir's contribution to the Suffrage Department of the Russian Women's Philanthropic Society played an essential role in crafting legislature adopted by the State Duma that directly awarded females their inheritance separate from their husband.

Shapir passed away on July 13, 1916 of illness in St. Petersburg and is buried in the Literatorskie Mostki of Volkovskiy Orthodox Cemetery.

Published Books 

 Antipody, 1882
 Na raznykha iazykakh, 1884
 Povesti i rasskazy, 1889
 Bez livbui, 1890
 Ee siatel'stuvo, 1891
 Mirazhi, 1892
 Vernulas'!, V slobodke. Deti otkazali, 1894
 Liubou', 1896
 Starye pesni, 1990
 Avdot'iny dochki, 1901
 Zakonnye zheny, 1902
 Drug destuvo, 1903
 Invalidy i novobrantsy, 1905
 Ne proverili, 1905
 V burnye gody, 1907
 Sonina khatva, 1908
 Chuzhoi, 1908
 Roza Sarona, 1910
 V temnote, 1910
 Sobranie sochineniia, 1910-1912

English Translations
The Settlement, from An Anthology of Russian Women's Writing, 1777-1992, Oxford University Press, 1994.

References

1850 births
1916 deaths
People from Lomonosov
People from Petergofsky Uyezd
Russian people of Swedish descent
Russian women novelists
Russian dramatists and playwrights
Russian women short story writers
Russian feminists
Russian women dramatists and playwrights